A  (also jotun; in the normalised scholarly spelling of Old Norse,  ; ; plural / ) or, in Old English,   (plural ) is a type of supernatural being in Germanic mythology. In Norse mythology, they are often contrasted with gods (Æsir and Vanir) and other non-human figures, such as dwarfs and elves, although the groupings are not always mutually exclusive.

The  are frequently attested throughout the Old Norse record, with  also featuring in the Old English epic poem Beowulf. The usage of the terms is dynamic, with an overall trend that the beings become portrayed as less impressive and more negative as Christianity becomes more influential. Although the term "giant" is sometimes used to gloss the word "" and its apparent synonyms in some translations and academic texts,  are not necessarily notably large.

The terms for the beings also have cognates in later folklore such as the British Yotun, Danish  and Finnish  which can share some common features such as being turned to stone in the day and living on the periphery of society.

Origin, appearance and terminology

Old Norse  (also ) and Old English  developed from the Proto-Germanic masculine noun . Proto-Germanic  is reconstructed from Old Norse  'consuming', Old English  'voracious, gluttonous', and Old High German  'greedy'. Old Norse  and Old High German  derive from the Proto-Germanic masculine noun . Orel observes that the Old Saxon adjective  'enormous' is likely also connected. Old Norse , Old English , and Old High German  'devil, evil spirit' derive from the Proto-Germanic masculine noun , itself derived from Proto-Germanic , which is etymologically connected to Sanskrit - 'strong, powerful, rich'.

Despite the terms used to refer to male and female  often being glossed as 'giant' and 'giantess' respectively, in Eddic sources they are often not described as notably large and are thus sometimes anglicised or left untranslated in translations and academic texts. Some female  are described as being beautiful, such as Gerðr and Hymir's partner while others are described as monstrous and having many heads.

As the influence of Christianity grew,  became demonised and typically portrayed as less intelligent, easier to outwit and more monstrous, as is common with giants in later Germanic folklore.

 has a much wider semantic scope in Old Norse literature than solely , also including individuals with unusual or supernatural traits such as witches, abnormally strong, large or ugly people, ghosts and berserkers.

Notable 

 Gerðr, a daughter of Gymir and wife of Freyr. Usually regarded as an earth-goddess.
 Fárbauti, the jötunn father of Loki with Laufey.
 Fenja and Menja, sisters who turn the mill Grotti to produce gold and Fróði's Peace.
 Jörð, the mother of Thor with Odin.
 Skaði, a daughter of Þjazi and later wife of Njörðr. Goddess associated with skiing and claimed as a mythical ancestor of Haakon Sigurdsson.
 Þjazi, a jötunn who once kidknapped Iðunn and her apples of youth. He was later killed by the gods and his eyes made into stars.
Urðr (Wyrd), Verðandi (Verthandi), and Skuld, the primary Norns.

Mythological origin
In a stanza of Völuspá hin skamma (found in the poem "Hyndluljóð") all  descend from Ymir. Gylfaginning elaborates on this, describing that the primordial  Ymir formed in the warm waters that arose in Ginnungagap when the rime of Niflheim was melted by the heat of Muspelheim. He lay there asleep, fed by milk from Auðumbla, whereupon from his left armpit he sweated a male and a female, and his legs begat a son with one another. Together, these children became the ancestors of all other .

This has been linked to a runic inscription on a sword hilt in Beowulf which describes the  being killed in an ancient flood and has been proposed to derive from Germanic and wider Indo-European mythology.

According to Gylfaginning, after Ymir was killed, his body was wrought into the world and a sea surrounded it. The gods then gave the surviving families  lands along the shore to settle, placing them in the periphery. Ymir's brows were then used to build Midgard and protect it from the  due to their known aggression.

Attributes and themes

Position as the "Other"

In the Eddic poem Vafþrúðnismál, Óðinn travels to the  Vafþrúðnir whereupon they engage in a wisdom contest. The völva who tells the Völuspá prophecy to Óðinn, while not explicitly described as a  but was raised by them. 

Cosmology in Germanic mythology, as with other oral cultures, has many apparent contradictions when viewed from a naturalistic standpoint.
Their lands of inhabitation are not restricted to this, also including forests, underground, and the shore. Sometimes they are referred to as living in specific geographical locations such as Ægir on Læsø. The seemingly ununified location of the  has been suggested to be an outcome of their intrinsically chaotic nature. Even within the same story, what seem like contradictions have been noted by scholars, prompting the proposal of a model that the otherworld where the  dwell can be reached from a number of passages or boundaries that cannot be traversed under normal conditions, such as the mountains, darkness and "flickering flame" crossed by Skírnir in Skírnismál.

In Eddic sources,  present a constant threat to gods and humans, often leading them to confrontation with Thor. In Hárbarðsljóð and Þrymskviða tell that if it was not for Thor and Mjöllnir,  would soon overrun Midgard and Asgard respectively.

Ancestors of gods and humans

In contrast, the female  Skaði chooses the male Vanr Njörðr as a husband. According to Ynglinga saga, she later had children with Odin, from whom kings such as Earl Hakon were descended. The  Freyr also marries Gerðr, who are the claimed ancestors of the Ynglings.
Odin also seduces the  Gunnlöð and Rindr and marries Jörð. In the cases when gods marry , they appear to be fully incorporated into the gods and are referred to as Ásynjur in Nafnaþulur.

Association with animals
One of the  who dwell in the wood Járnviðr is a mother of jötnar in the forms of wolves and from whom are descended all wolves. This  has been suggested to be Angrboða, the  who begat with Loki the monstrous wolf Fenrir and venomous worm Jörmungandr who become enemies of the gods. Also in Járnviðr dwells the jötunn  Eggþér who has been interpreted as either a guardian of the gýgjar who live there or a herdsman of the wolves. Wolves are also taken as mounts by  such as Hyndla and Hyrrokkin, the latter of which using snakes as reins. This is further attested in skaldic poetry in which "wolf" is described by the kennings "Leikn's horse", "Gjálp's horse", "Gríðr's horse", while a group of wolves is referred to as "Gríðr's grey herd of horses".

Other , such as Þjazi and Suttungr are able to become eagles by wearing their , or resemble them like Griðr in Illuga saga Gríðarfóstra who has hands like eagle talons.

Demonisation
In later material composed during the Christian period such as the legendary sagas,  are often portrayed as uncivilised and cannibalistic. In the case of Bárðar saga Snæfellsáss and Hálfdanar saga Brönufóstra they specifically eat both human and horse meat, the latter of which was directly associated with heathen practices. Female  are explicitly described as being heathen in some later sources such as Orms þáttr Stórólfssonar, in which religion prevents her from being with the hero, and the legendary saga Þorsteins þáttr bæjarmagns, in which she must be baptised before marrying the hero.

Post-medieval folklore

They commonly show an aversion to Christianity, often showing a disdain for the ringing of church bells. Similarities are also both seen in their role in the construction of stoneworks. Akin to the Old Norse tale of the  who built the wall of Ásgarðr, giants often enter into wagers involved in the building of churches which they later lose, as with the tale of Jätten Finn who is attributed with the construction of Lund Cathedral. Ruins are also attributed to the works of both beings, as in the Old English poem The Ruin and the aetiological story of Wade's Causeway in Yorkshire.

According to folklore, it awakens every New Year at midnight whereupon it visits the Loch of Scockness to drink. Orcadian folklore also explains the Ring of Brodgar as dancing giants who were turned to stone by the morning sun. This motif is also seen in Helgakviða Hjörvarðssonar, in which the  Hrímgerðr engages in a senna with Helgi Hundingsbane until the sun rises and she is turned to stone.

Toponomy
Placenames derived from þurs or cognate:

England
 Thursford (Þyrs ford) – Village in Norfolk
 Thursgill (Þurs' gill) – Gill in West Riding of Yorkshire, field in Cumbria
 Thruss Pits (Þyrs pit) – Field in Derbyshire
 Thrispin Head (Þurs fen) – Wetland in West Riding of Yorkshire
 Trusey Hill (Þyrs hill) – Hill in East Riding of Yorkshire

See also 
 Asura – a comparable class of deities in Indian mythology
 Div – a comparable class of beings in Islamic-Persian lore
 Ents
 Giants (Marvel Comics)
 Giant (Dungeons & Dragons)
 Titan – a comparable class of deities in Greek mythology

Citations

Bibliography

Primary

Secondary

External links 
 

 
Types of deities